Carol Brewster (born Miriam Elizabeth Hechler; February 25, 1927 – February 1, 2013) was an American actress and model.

After she had a role as a model in a Ziegfeld Follies film, Brewster's first acting role came in The Barkleys of Broadway (1949).

In 1955, Brewster came down with polio, causing her to spend 29 days in an iron lung and nine months in a wheel chair. In 1957, she acted on stage in Los Angeles, with a starring role in The Darling Darlinis at the Ivar Theater.

During a hiatus in her acting career, Brewster began designing purses, an endeavor that grew into a business that had 10 employees.

Death 
Brewster died at 85 in Big Bear Lake, California on February 1, 2013.

Filmography

 It's a Great Feeling (1949)
 The Barkleys of Broadway (1949)
 Flamingo Road (1949)
 The Girl from Jones Beach (1949)
 A Life of Her Own (1950)
 Two Tickets to Broadway (1951)
 Casa Manana (1951)
 The Belle of New York (1952)
 Untamed Women (1952)
 Cat-Women of the Moon (1953)
 The Maverick Queen (1955)
 Son of Sinbad (1955)
 Police Nurse (1963)
 The Alfred Hitchcock Hour: "Night Fever" (1965) (TV)
 Branded: "A Proud Town" (1965) (TV)
 Death Valley Days: "Fighting Sky Pilot" with Skip Homeier (1965) (TV)
 Perry Mason: "The Case of the Vanishing Victim" (1966) (TV)
 Rosemary's Baby (1968)
 Hell's Bloody Devils'' (1970)

References

External links

 Glamour girls of he silver screen

American film actresses
1927 births
2013 deaths
20th-century American actresses
Death in California
People from California
21st-century American women